The 8th Hum Awards by Hum Network was held on 24 September 2022 to celebrate the excellence in music, fashion, and Hum Television Dramas in 2021. The ceremony took place in FirstOntario Centre, Hamilton, Canada. The ceremony was televised on Hum TV.

A portion of the revenue of tickets of the awards was donated to the victims of 2022 Pakistan floods.

Viewers' Choice Awards 
The nominations for viewers' choice awards were announced on 1 September 2022.

Critics' Choice Awards

Notes 
 All six plays nominated for Best Drama Serial have been produced by Momina Duraid.
 Chupke Chupke has received the most nominations (6) so far.
 As usual Momina Duraid won every Best Drama award in a ceremony produced by herself.

References

Hum Awards
2022 television awards
2022 music awards